Alconchel de la Estrella is a municipality in Cuenca, Castile-La Mancha, Spain.

Population 
Alconchel de la Estrella has a population of 88 inhabitants, of which 51 are male and 37 are female.

Geography 

Alconchel de la Estrella is located in the province of Cuenca, which is located in the autonomous region of Castile-La Mancha. It is located 6 km from Montalbanejo, 7 from Villalgordo del Marquesado, and 82 from Cuenca proper.

Administration

References

Municipalities in the Province of Cuenca